Dancing Storybook is a Canadian children's television series which aired on CBC Television in 1959.

Premise
This Winnipeg-produced children's show featured performances from the Royal Winnipeg Ballet, who previously performed in CBC's Toes in Tempo series. The series plot involves two youths, Woody (Wally Martin) and Sue (Sheila McKinnon), who look for a patch from their father's magic jacket. Eric Wild, principal conductor of the Royal Winnipeg Ballet at that time, was the series musical director.

Scheduling
The half-hour series aired on Wednesdays at 5 p.m. from 1 April to 24 June 1959.

References

CBC Television original programming
1959 Canadian television series debuts
1959 Canadian television series endings
1950s Canadian children's television series
Black-and-white Canadian television shows